Myrmaplata plataleoides, also called the red weaver-ant mimicking jumper, is a jumping spider that mimics the Asian weaver ant (Oecophylla smaragdina) in morphology and behaviour. This species is found in India, Sri Lanka, China and many parts of Southeast Asia.

Unlike the weaver ants, M. plataleoides does not bite people, and indeed seems rather timid.

Description
Myrmaplata plataleoides, especially the females, mimic weaver ants in size, shape and colour. The body of M. plataleoides appears like an ant, which has three body segments and six legs, by having constrictions on the cephalothorax and abdomen. This creates the illusion of having a distinct head, thorax and gaster of the weaver ant, complete with a long and slender waist. The large compound eyes of the weaver ant are mimicked by two black patches on the head. The female's front legs resemble the feelers of weaver ants, while the males resemble a larger ant carrying a smaller one.

Sexual dimorphism
Red weaver ant mimicking jumpers are sexually dimorphic. Female jumpers, measuring about 6–7 mm, are the best mimics of the weaver ants while the males, which usually measure about 9–12 mm in length, give the appearance of a weaver ant carrying a minor worker due to their elongated chelicerae which may be as long as one-third to half their body length. These elongated chelicerae are a secondary sexual characteristic of the males. The males use their long fangs like swords to fight off rivals. They can split their jaws, normally held closed, to unfold their fangs when required.

Behaviour
The spiders live in trees and bushes where the weaver ants live in colonies. By mimicking the ants, they are able to stay close to them, thus gaining protection from predators since weaver ants taste bad and have a painful bite (Batesian mimicry). Mimicry is also achieved by stealing from the ant brood and absorbing the smell of the colony.  This strategy appears to be successful. Though these spiders mimic the weaver ants very well, they are known to stay away from them. They weave a thin web on leaves, hide under their webbing and ambush their prey.

The Kerengga ant-like jumper also mimics ant-like behaviour by the style of locomotion and by waving their front legs like antennae. These jumping-spiders jump only when their safety is threatened.

References

  (2008): The world spider catalog, version 8.5. American Museum of Natural History.

Salticidae
Spiders of Asia
Spiders described in 1869